Trump Winery (formerly Kluge Estate Winery and Vineyard) is a winery on Trump Vineyard Estates in the Piedmont region of the Commonwealth of Virginia in the county of Albemarle. It is within the Monticello viticultural area and is among the 23 wineries on the Monticello Wine Trail.

The vineyard was purchased by businessman Donald Trump in April 2011 and re-opened in October 2011. Since 2012, it has been owned and operated by Trump's son Eric, trading as Eric Trump Wine Manufacturing LLC.

The  of vinifera varieties makes it the largest vineyard in Virginia and the largest French vinifera on the East Coast, according to the company.

Acquisition
Patricia Kluge, former wife of American billionaire John Kluge, kept Albemarle in their 1990 divorce settlement. Afterwards, Kluge spent her fortune establishing an award-winning vineyard and winery which opened in 1999. She and her third husband, William Moses, took out $65 million in loans and mortgaged the mansion to finance production expansion and a related real-estate venture. In 2011, the couple defaulted on the loans and Bank of America acquired the mortgage on the mansion, Albemarle House. The land outside the mansion's front door and bordering its long driveway is a  stretch of rolling greenery that had a former life as John Kluge's private  Arnold Palmer–designed golf course. A quirk in the divorce settlement let John Kluge own this patch, as his ex-wife took the mansion and the land underneath, insulating it from Patricia's financial woes. The land was still the family's to give, after Mr. Kluge died in 2010, leaving it in a trust to his son, John Kluge Jr., with Patricia as trustee.

Trump, a longstanding friend of John and Patricia Kluge, purchased the  estate, including the vineyards and winemaking operation, out of foreclosure from three different banks for $8.5 million. He initially offered the banks $20 million to bail out Kluge Estate, but when they refused, he began to buy the property through foreclosure auctions and private purchases. After acquiring the winery, Trump hired Patricia Kluge as vice president of operations and William Moses as chief executive officer. He also bought the parcel directly from the Kluge trust for $150,000. The bank alleged that Trump subsequently arranged for "No Trespassing" signs to be placed around the mansion allowing the lawns to become overgrown in order to ward off potential buyers and to give the appearance of Trump's exclusive access to the property, although the bank's interest in the main house included right-of-way easements. Trump placed a winning bid of $3.6 million at auction for the mansion property, a significant discount from the $16 million the bank had paid at the foreclosure auction and Patricia's original $100 million asking price. Bank of America rejected the bid and retained possession.

In October 2012, Trump bought Albemarle House from Bank of America for $6.7 million, completing his acquisition of the entire estate.

Operations
The remodeled , 45-room mansion was opened in May 2015 as ‘Albemarle Estate at Trump Winery’.  In addition to the winery and vineyard, business operations include the hotel and facilities to host public banquets, weddings, corporate and winery events.

The winery's  vineyard is the largest in Virginia and its French vinifera acreage is the largest on the East Coast. In March 2016, Donald Trump stated publicly that he owned "the largest winery on the East Coast" which Politifact surmised as a ‘false statement' noting the winery makes 36,000 cases of wine per year, roughly half the production of Williamsburg Winery or Chateau Morrisette Winery.

The winery's manager, Kerry Hannon Woolard, supported Donald Trump's 2016 presidential campaign and was a guest speaker at the 2016 Republican National Convention.

Reviews
James Suckling scored the winery's 2009 Blanc de Blanc 90 points and the 2010 Sparkling Reserve 91 points.

In March 2013, Wine Enthusiast magazine gave the 2007 Trump SP Reserve a 91-point rating, which was at that time the highest rating for a still or sparkling Virginia wine.

The 2020 San Francisco International Wine Competition awarded the winery's 2014 Sparkling Reserve, Best in Class-Brut, Double Gold, 97 points, scoring higher than those from Napa, Sonoma, Spain, Italy, Australia and Champagne.

References

External links

2011 establishments in Virginia
Food and drink companies established in 2011
Wineries in Virginia
Business career of Donald Trump
Charlottesville, Virginia